Prince Neungchang (Hangul: 능창군, Hanja: 綾昌君; 16 July 1599 - 17 November 1615) or formally called Grand Prince Neungchang personal name Yi Jeon was a Korean Royal Prince as the third son of Wonjong of Joseon and Queen Inheon of the Neungseong Gu clan. He was the second little brother of Injo of Joseon. It was said that he was good in horse riding and martial arts (especially archery).

Biography

Early life
The future Grand Prince Neungchang was born on 16 July 1599 (32nd year reign of Seonjo of Joseon) in Saemun-ri, Seongseo, Hanseong-bu, Kingdom of Joseon as the youngest son of Prince Jeongwon (정원군, 定遠君) and Princess Consort Yeonju of the Neungseong Gu clan (연주군부인, 連珠郡夫人), the daughter of Gu Sa-Maeng (구사맹).

Although he was the son of Prince Jeongwon, but later became the adoptive son of his 2nd uncle, Prince Sinseong (신성군) who died without any issue left and was taken care by his adoptive mother, Princess Consort Sin (군부인 신씨), the daughter of Sin-Rib (신립). Therefore, Sin-Ib (신입) became his maternal grandfather, both of Sin Gyeong-Jin (신경진) and Sin Gyeong-Hui (신경희) become his maternal uncles.

It was said that from the young age, the Prince was excellent in talent and wisdom, also had a good appearance. He liked to read and because of that, he was nicknamed as Hyeongongja (현공자, 賢公子). Later in 1601, when he was still 3 years old, he was given royal title Master Neungchang (능창수, 綾昌守) at first, but then in 1612, at 14 years old, he became Prince Neungchang (능창군, 綾昌君).

During Gwanghaegun of Joseon's reign

During the Prince's half uncle, Gwanghaegun of Joseon's reign periods, there was a rumor that he wanted to become king because he threatened Gwanghae's throne. Later, in 1608 (Gwanghaegun's ascension to the throne), immediately after Yu Yeong-Gyeong (유영경)'s death in prison, the Prince become Jeongunwonjonggongsin rank 1 (정운원종공신 1등). Later, in 1613 (5th year reign of Gwanghaegun), after Prince Imhae (임해군) was imprisoned, he became Iksawonjonggongsin rank 1 (익사원종공신 1등).

Then, on 14 August 1615, there was a speculation that Gwanghae wanted to appointed him as Grand Prince Neungchang (능창대군, 綾昌大君). However, on 22 August in the same year, Gwanghae then captured Neungchang and after speak in Injeongmun (인정문, 仁政門), he imprisoned him and exiled him to Gyodong-do, Ganghwa.

Later life
Later, on 17 November 1615 (8th year reign of Gwanghaegun of Joseon), the Prince committed suicide after write a letter to his parents and passed it into his brother-in-law at the government office. However, those Susaeng (수생) couldn'1t deliver his letter to his parents right away, so he put it in a sash and buried it in the soil. Meanwhile, in March 16123, after his oldest brother, Grand Prince Neungyang (능양대군) got rebellion and succeeded Gwanghae's throne, Neungchang's letter was delivered to him.

Meanwhile, on 19 November 1615 (7th year reign of Gwanghaegun of Joseon), Gwanghae exiled him to Gyo-dong on charges of treason and he was immediately killed and died in there. Heard if he was death, their father, Wonjong was so heartbroken over this that makes he suddenly caught an illness, and while drinking the alcohol, he died on 2 February 1619 (11st year reign of Gwanghaegun of Joseon) at 40 years old. Meanwhile, on 13 March 1623, his oldest brother, Prince Neungyang (능양군) make a rebellion and then ascended the throne. At this time, along with Gim Je-nam (김제남), Grand Prince Yeongchang (영창대군), Yi Tae-Gyeong, Prince Jilleung (이태경 진릉군), and the others were reinstated.

The Prince was firstly honoured as Gadeokdaebu (가덕대부, 贈嘉德大夫), then on 15 October 1629 (Injo's 7th year reign), he was promoted to Hyeollokdaebu (현록대부, 贈顯祿大夫). Later, after his parents became Grand Internal Prince (대원군, 大院君; Daewongun)	 and Grand Internal Princess Consort (부대부인, 府大夫人; Budaebuin) in 1630, the Princes became a Grand Prince (대군, 大君; Daegun) on 4 May 1632 (Injo's 10th year reign). Therefore, his tombstone was named as Grand Prince Neungchang (능창대군, 綾昌大君).

Aftermath and tomb
The Prince died on 17 November 1615 not long after his marriage with Lady Gu (구씨; the future Princess Consort Gu, 군부인 구씨) in March 1615. Although she didn't gave him any child, but with a concubine, he had 1 daughter, Princess Yi Yeong-On (향주 이영온) whom later married Heo-Seo (허서), the 3rd little brother of Heo-Mok (허목).

He was firstly buried in Gunjang-ri, Geumchon-myeon, Yangju-gun, Gyeonggi-do (later became the parts of Geumgok-ri (Geumgok-dong, Namyangju-si), Migeum-myeon). Then, on 29 October 1629 (6th year reign of Injo of Joseon), his tomb was relocated in Nanji-won, Geuncheohyeok-dong, Namhansanseong Fortress, Godae-myeon, Gwangju-gun, Gyeonggi-do. Later, it was moved again to the Mountain behind Gogol Gungan Village, Chungung-ri, Dongbu-myeon, Gwangju-gun, Gyeonggi-do.

Later, on 13 May 1658, his adopted son, Grand Prince Inpyeong (인평대군) died and was then buried on 13 July in the same year which built right next to Neungchang's tomb but, then moved to Pocheon-si, Gyeonggi-do after 35 years. In the left side, Yi Hyeok, Prince Uiwon (이혁 의원군) and his wife's tomb were built and Yi Yeon-Eung (이연응) and his wife's tomb were built below from there.

Meanwhile, Neungchang's house was confiscated by Gwanghaegun of Joseon and builted in Gyeongdeok Palace (경덕궁, 慶德宮). Later, after his death, in March 1623, his first big brother, Prince Neungyang (능양군) had rebellion and then ascended the throne as King Injo then, reinstated on 15 March in the same year. He later honoured as Gadeokdaebu (가덕대부) firstly and then changed into Hyeollokdaebu (현록대부). Injo later make his third son, Grand Prince Inpyeong (인평대군) became Neungchang's adopted son.

Family
Father: 
Biological: Wonjong of Joseon (2 August 1580 - 29 December 1619) (조선 원종)
Adopted (2nd uncle): Yi Hu, Prince Sinseong (6 January 1579 - 8 December 1592) (이후 신성군)
Grandfather: Seonjo of Joseon (26 November 1552 - 16 March 1608) (조선 선조왕)
Grandmother: Royal Noble Consort In of the Suwon Gim clan (1555 - 10 December 1613) (인빈 김씨)
Mother:
Biological: Queen Inheon of the Neungseong Gu clan (17 April 1578 - 14 January 1626) (인헌왕후 구씨)
Grandfather: Gu Sa-maeng, Duke Munui, Internal Prince Neungan (1531 - 1 April 1604) (구사맹 문의공 능안부원군)
Grandmother: Internal Princess Consort Pyeongsan of the Pyeongsan Sin clan (1538 - 1562) (평산부부인 평산 신씨)
Adopted: Princess Consort, of the Pyeongsan Sin clan (군부인 평산 신씨)
Grandfather: Sin-Rib (신립)
Grandmother: Lady Yi (이씨)
Sibling(s):
Big brother: Yi Jong, Grand Prince Neungyang (7 December 1595 - 17 June 1649) (이종 능양대군)
Big sister In-law: Queen Inryeol of the Cheongju Han clan (16 August 1594 - 16 January 1636) (인열왕후 한씨) – had 6 sons and 1 unnamed daughter.
Big sister In-law: Queen Jangryeol of the Yangju Jo clan (16 December 1624 - 20 September 1688) (장렬왕후 조씨) — No issue.
Big brother: Yi Bo, Grand Prince Neungwon (15 May 1598 - 26 January 1656) (이보 능원대군)
Big sister In-law: Grand Princess Consort Munhwa of the Munhwa Yu clan (27 October 1598 - 3 August 1676) (문화부부인 문화 유씨) – had several children but all of them died in birth/pregnancy.
Big sister In-law: Grand Princess Consort, of the Yeongam Gim clan (9 March 1610 - 25 January 1696) (부부인 영암 김씨) – had 4 sons and 4 daughters.
Consorts and their Respective Issue(s):
Grand Princess Consort, of the Neungseong Gu clan (부부인 능성 구씨) — No issue.
Unknown woman, from a Palace Maid
Princess Yi Yeong-On (향주 이영온) – 1st and the only daughter.

Others
In Prince Namyeon (남연군), Prince Imperial Heung (흥친왕), also Prince Yeongseon (영선군)'s family registers during the Japanese Colonial Periods, both of they were listed as the descendants of Grand Prince Neungchang (7th generation).
Although, Heo-Mok (허목) built and wrote the tombstones for his wife, in-laws, and daughter-in-law one by one, but only his oldest daughter whom had no full inscriptions about her life, just recorded if she married with Heo-Seo (허서), Heo-Mok's 3rd little brother.
He had the same title name like Yi Suk, Prince Neungchang (이숙 능창군; ? - 30 November 1768) who was the son of Yi Yeon, Prince Hwasan (이연 화산군) and the grandson of Yi Geon, Prince Haewon (이건 해원군), also the son of Yi Gong, Prince Inseong (이공 인성군), the other illegitimate son of King Seonjo. So, Prince Neungchang (Yi Suk) was Prince Neungchang (Yi Jeon)'s descendant too.

In popular culture
Portrayed by Lee Seok-min in the 2003 SBS The King's Woman.

References

External links

1598 births
1615 deaths
16th-century Korean people
Korean princes
House of Yi
17th-century Korean people
People from Seoul